Carroll County is a county in the U.S. state of Mississippi. As of the 2020 census, the population was 9,998. Its county seats are Carrollton and Vaiden. The county is named for Charles Carroll of Carrollton, the last surviving signatory of the Declaration of Independence.

Carroll County is part of the Greenwood, Micropolitan Statistical Area. Bordered by the Yazoo River on the west and the Big Black River to the east, it is considered within the Mississippi Delta region. Most of its land is in the hill country.

The Porter Wagoner song "The Carroll County Accident" was set here. The county is referred to in the third verse of Bobbie Gentry's 1967 hit song, "Ode to Billie Joe".

History
This area was developed by European Americans for cotton plantations near the rivers. These were dependent on the labor of large gangs of enslaved African Americans. After the American Civil War, many freedmen worked as sharecroppers or tenant farmers on the plantations. Other areas were harvested for timber.

In the period from 1877 to 1950, Carroll County had 29 documented lynchings of African Americans, the second-highest number in the state.

Geography
Carroll County consists of rolling hills, largely covered with trees. The county's highest point is adjacent to State Highway 35, 8 miles (13 km) WSW of Winona, at 540' (165m) ASL.

Major highways

  Interstate 55
  U.S. Route 51
  U.S. Route 82
  Mississippi Highway 17
  Mississippi Highway 35

Adjacent counties

 Grenada County - north
 Montgomery County - east
 Attala County - southeast
 Holmes County - southwest
 Leflore County - west

Demographics

From 1940 to 1970, the county population declined markedly, as many African Americans left in the Great Migration to West Coast cities that had a growing defense industry. Others went North to Chicago and other industrial cities. Rural whites also moved to cities to find work.

2020 census

As of the 2020 United States census, there were 9,998 people, 3,827 households, and 2,685 families residing in the county.

2000 census
As of the 2000 United States Census, there were 10,769 people, 4,071 households, and 3,069 families in the county. The population density was 17/sqmi (7/km2). There were 4,888 housing units at an average density of 8/sqmi (3/km2). The racial makeup of the county was 62.67% White, 36.61% Black or African American, 0.07% Native American, 0.16% Asian, 0.01% Pacific Islander, 0.13% from other races, and 0.36% from two or more races.  0.73% of the population were Hispanic or Latino of any race.

There were 4,071 households, out of which 32.10% had children under the age of 18 living with them, 56.20% were married couples living together, 15.20% had a female householder with no husband present, and 24.60% were non-families. 22.40% of all households were made up of individuals, and 10.80% had someone living alone who was 65 years of age or older. The average household size was 2.57 and the average family size was 3.01.

The largest ancestry groups in Carroll County were English 51%, African 38.6%, and Scots-Irish 12.1%

The county population contained 24.50% under the age of 18, 9.60% from 18 to 24, 26.70% from 25 to 44, 25.70% from 45 to 64, and 13.60% who were 65 years of age or older. The median age was 38 years. For every 100 females, there were 99.20 males. For every 100 females age 18 and over, there were 97.00 males.

The median income for a household in the county was $28,878, and the median income for a family was $35,711. Males had a median income of $28,459 versus $19,695 for females. The per capita income for the county was $15,744. About 13.70% of families and 16.00% of the population were below the poverty line, including 17.30% of those under age 18 and 23.50% of those age 65 or over.

Education
Carroll County School District is the area public school district. It operates one high school, J. Z. George High School, and formerly operated Vaiden High School.

Carroll Academy is an area private school that is financially supported by the Council of Conservative Citizens, a white supremacist group.

Pillow Academy in unincorporated Leflore County, near Greenwood, enrolls some students from Carroll County. It originally was a segregation academy.

Communities

Towns
 Carrollton (county seat)
 North Carrollton
 Vaiden (county seat)

Unincorporated places

 Avalon
 Black Hawk
 Coila
 McCarley
 Oklahoma
 Teoc
 Valley Hill

Notable people
 Henry Pinckney McCain - US Army General, born in Carroll County 1861
 Lafayette Joseph Lott –  Democratic politician, born in Carroll County 1863
 John S. McCain, Sr. - (US Navy Admiral), born in Carroll County 1884
 Mississippi John Hurt - Musician, born in Carroll County 1893

Politics

See also

 National Register of Historic Places listings in Carroll County, Mississippi

References

 
Mississippi counties
Greenwood, Mississippi micropolitan area
1833 establishments in Mississippi
Populated places established in 1833